The palatal ejective is a type of consonantal sound, used in some spoken languages.

Features
Features of the palatal ejective:

Occurrence
This sound is largely confined to the indigenous languages of the Americas. It occurs in:
 Haida
 Jaqaru
 Keres
 Nǁng, a Khoisan language
 Tindi, a Caucasian language

See also
 List of phonetics topics

External links
 

Ejectives
Palatal consonants
Oral consonants
Central consonants